IC 2233, also known as UGC 4278, is a spiral galaxy lying in the constellation of Lynx. IC 2233 is located between 26 and 40 million light-years away from Earth. A comparatively quiet galaxy with a low rate of star formation (less than one solar mass every twenty years), it was long thought to be possibly interacting with the Bear's Paw galaxy. However, this is now considered highly unlikely as radio observations with the Very Large Array showed the two galaxies lie at different distances.  This galaxy was discovered by British astronomer Isaac Roberts in 1894.

Gallery

References

2233
IC 2233
004278